Pobieda is an urban-type settlement in the Snizhne Municipality, Horlivka Raion, Donetsk Oblast (province) of eastern Ukraine. Population:

Demographics
Native language as of the Ukrainian Census of 2001:
 Ukrainian 17.35%
 Russian 82.65%

References

Urban-type settlements in Horlivka Raion